Clement Kafwafwa (born 11 December 1979) is a Malawian former international footballer who played as a defender. His strength was delivering long passes up the field.

During his playing career, Kafwafwa most notably played for Danish lower division clubs Holbæk B&I, Lolland-Falster Alliancen and NB Bornholm.

In January 2020, Kafwafwa was appointed team manager of the Malawi national team, a position he also held between 2015 and 2016 under head coach Ernest Mtawali.

References

1979 births
Living people
Malawian footballers
Malawi international footballers
Malawian expatriate footballers
Expatriate men's footballers in Denmark
Association football defenders
Holbæk B&I players